Arek is a given name for males.

Arek may also refer to:

Arek, is a deity character in the Lufia series II of console role-playing game
Arek Monthly, an Armenian Egyptian periodical in Arabic